(born January 28, 1928) is a Japanese tanka poet and literary critic.

Overviews 
She also has an interest in Noh drama, and her works have been performed at the National Theatre of Japan. Heavenly Maiden Tanka is a collection of her poems translated by Hatsue Kawamura and Jane Reichhold. She has won a number of prizes, including the 45th Yomiuri Prize and the Asahi Prize.

References

1928 births
Living people
People from Tokyo
20th-century Japanese poets
Yomiuri Prize winners
Persons of Cultural Merit